Gonzalo Ezequiel Paz (born 6 June 1993) is an Argentine professional footballer who plays as a left-back for Super League Greece club Levadiakos.

Club career
Paz played for the Chacarita Juniors academy from the age of nine, before joining Universidad Católica in Chile in 2011. A year later, Deportivo Armenio signed Paz. He made his debut as a late substitute in a Primera B Metropolitana victory away to Tristán Suárez on 22 September 2013, with his first start arriving on 17 November against Flandria. He featured eight times in 2013–14, placing fourteenth. Sixty-eight appearances followed in four seasons, twenty-six of which came in Primera C Metropolitana following 2016 relegation. In 2017, Paz was loaned to Torneo Federal B's El Linqueño; featuring in ten games.

Paz joined Swiss Promotion League side Stade Nyonnais on loan in 2018. On 11 July 2018, after returning from Switzerland's third tier, Paz joined his homeland's equivalent after agreeing terms with Barracas Central. His first appearances arrived within the next three months versus Comunicaciones and Atlanta respectively.

International career
In 2016, Paz was called up to the Argentina U23s by Julio Olarticoechea ahead of the Sait Nagjee Trophy in India.

Career statistics
.

Honours
Barracas Central
Primera B Metropolitana: 2018–19

References

External links

1993 births
Living people
People from Morón Partido
Argentine footballers
Argentina youth international footballers
Association football defenders
Argentine expatriate footballers
Primera B Metropolitana players
Primera C Metropolitana players
Deportivo Armenio footballers
Club Atlético El Linqueño players
FC Stade Nyonnais players
Barracas Central players
Sacachispas Fútbol Club players
Expatriate footballers in Switzerland
Argentine expatriate sportspeople in Switzerland
Sportspeople from Buenos Aires Province